Mark Louis Hatzenbuehler is the John L. Loeb Associate Professor of the Social Sciences in the Psychology Department at Harvard University. He was previously a tenured associate professor in the Department of Sociomedical Sciences at Columbia University. Much of his research focuses on the effects of social stigma on mental health among members of minority groups. He has received multiple awards from professional societies, including the 2016 Janet Taylor Spence Award from the Association for Psychological Science.

References

External links
Faculty page

Harvard University faculty
Yale University alumni
Living people
21st-century American psychologists
Year of birth missing (living people)